Anansus is a genus of African cellar spiders that was first described by B. A. Huber in 2007.

Species
 it contains five species, found only in Africa:
Anansus aowin Huber, 2007 (type) – Ivory Coast
Anansus atewa Huber & Kwapong, 2013 – Ghana
Anansus debakkeri Huber, 2007 – Congo
Anansus ewe Huber, 2007 – West Africa
Anansus kamwai Huber, 2014 – Cameroon

See also
 List of Pholcidae species

References

Araneomorphae genera
Pholcidae
Spiders of Africa